The 2008 Spengler Cup was held in Davos, Switzerland from December 26 to December 31, 2008.  All matches were played at host HC Davos's home Vaillant Arena. The final was won 5-3 by HC Dynamo Moscow over Team Canada.

Teams participating
 Team Canada
 HC Davos (host)
 ERC Ingolstadt
 HC Energie Karlovy Vary
 HC Dynamo Moscow

Tournament

Round-Robin results

All times local (CET/UTC +1)

Finals

References

External links
Spenglercup.ch

2008–09
2008–09 in Swiss ice hockey
2008–09 in Czech ice hockey
2008–09 in Canadian ice hockey
2008–09 in German ice hockey
2008–09 in Russian ice hockey
December 2008 sports events in Europe